Club Deportivo Hermanos Colmenarez is a Venezuelan football club based in Alberto Arvelo Torrealba Municipality, Barinas state. Founded in 2015, the club play in the Venezuelan Primera División, hosting their home matches at the Estadio Agustín Tovar in Barinas.

History
Originally founded in 2016, the club first reached the Venezuelan Tercera División in the 2017 season. In December of that year, the club merged with then Tercera División champions Madeira Club Lara Asociación Civil (which was founded on 19 February 2015), and started to play in the Segunda División.

In 2020, after two seasons with mid-table positions, Hermanos Colmenarez won the second division after defeating Llaneros de Guanare in the semifinals and Universidad Central de Venezuela in the finals.

Honours
Venezuelan Segunda División: 2020
Venezuelan Tercera División: 2017

References

External links
 

Football clubs in Venezuela
Association football clubs established in 2015
2015 establishments in Venezuela